Plutonium occurs in a variety of allotropes, even at ambient pressure.  These allotropes differ widely in crystal structure and density; the α and δ allotropes differ in density by more than 25% at constant pressure.

Overview
Plutonium normally has six allotropes and forms a seventh (zeta, ζ) under high temperature and a limited pressure range. These allotropes have very similar energy levels but significantly varying densities and crystal structures. This makes plutonium very sensitive to changes in temperature, pressure, or chemistry, and allows for dramatic volume changes following phase transitions. Unlike most materials, plutonium increases in density when it melts, by 2.5%, but the liquid metal exhibits a linear decrease in density with temperature. Densities of the different allotropes vary from 16.00 g/cm3 to 19.86 g/cm3.

Machining plutonium
The presence of these many allotropes makes machining plutonium very difficult, as it changes state very readily. For example, the α phase exists at room temperature in unalloyed plutonium. It has machining characteristics similar to cast iron but changes to the β phase (beta phase) at slightly higher temperatures. The reasons for the complicated phase diagram are not entirely understood; recent research has focused on constructing accurate computer models of the phase transitions. The α phase has a low-symmetry monoclinic structure, hence its poor conductivity, brittleness, strength and compressibility.

Stabilization
Plutonium in the δ phase (delta phase) normally exists in the 310 °C to 452 °C range but is stable at room temperature when alloyed with a small percentage of gallium, aluminium, or cerium, enhancing workability and allowing it to be welded in weapons applications. The delta phase has more typical metallic character, and is roughly as strong and malleable as aluminium. In fission weapons, the explosive shock waves used to compress a plutonium core will also cause a transition from the usual delta phase plutonium to the denser alpha phase, significantly helping to achieve supercriticality. The plutonium-gallium alloy is the most common δ-stabilized alloy.

Gallium, aluminium, americium, scandium and cerium can stabilize the δ phase of plutonium for room temperature. Silicon, indium, zinc and zirconium allow formation of metastable δ state when rapidly cooled. High amount of hafnium, holmium and thallium also allows retaining some of the δ phase at room temperature. Neptunium is the only element that can stabilize the α phase at higher temperatures. Titanium, hafnium and zirconium stabilize the β phase at room temperature when rapidly cooled.

References

Plutonium
Plutonium